A list of the films produced in Mexico in 1969 (see 1969 in film):

1969

See also
1969 in Mexico

External links

1969
Films
Mexican